Joe Woods may refer to:

 Joe Wood (footballer) (1904–1972), or Joe Woods, Australian rules footballer
 Joe Woods (American football) (born 1970), American football coach

See also
Joseph Woods (disambiguation)